The 2021 Dubai World Cup was a horse race run at Meydan Racecourse in Dubai on 27 March 2021. It was the 25th running of the race after the planned 2020 event was cancelled due to the COVID-19 pandemic. The total prize money for the race was $12 million, with the winner receiving $7.2 million.

The race was won by Mystic Guide, trained in the United States by Michael Stidham, and ridden by Luis Saez.

Race

Full result

Non-runners: Great Scot, Military Law (both withdrawn after getting loose before start)

References

External links
Dubai Racing Club
Emirates Racing Authority

Dubai World Cup
Dubai World Cup
Dubai World Cup
Dubai World Cup